George Reynolds (January 1, 1842 – August 9, 1909) was a general authority of the Church of Jesus Christ of Latter-day Saints (LDS Church), a longtime secretary to the church's First Presidency, and a party to the 1878 United States Supreme Court case Reynolds v. United States, the first freedom of religion case to issue from that court.

Early life
Reynolds was born in Marylebone, England, to George Reynolds and Julia Ann Tautz. He spent much of his childhood under the care of his maternal grandmother. His grandmother employed a maid, Sarah White, who invited nine-year-old Reynolds to attend a meeting of the LDS Church with her. Reynolds received permission from his grandmother to do so; Reynolds attended a sacrament meeting of the church's Paddington Branch with White, and almost immediately decided that he wished to become a member.

However, Reynolds's parents refused to allow him to be baptized a member of the church. Often, he would evade his parents' wishes and attend the Sunday meetings in Paddington. When Reynolds was 14 years old, he attended the church's Somers Town Branch, where he was unknown, and asked to be received into the church by baptism. Not knowing that Reynolds' parents had forbidden the action, the branch president, George Teasdale, baptized him on May 4, 1856; Reynolds was confirmed a member of the church by Teasdale on May 11, 1856.

In December 1856, Reynolds was given the Aaronic priesthood and ordained to the office of deacon. He was responsible for opening the doors to the Sunday meetinghouse for the Somers Town Branch and organizing the seating in preparation for sacrament meeting. In May 1857, at the age of 15, Reynolds was ordained to the office of priest. Reynolds engaged in open-air preaching in the streets of London, usually with an adult elder of the church. After Reynolds began street preaching, his parents discovered that he had become a Latter-day Saint.

In August 1860, Reynolds was given the Melchizedek priesthood and ordained to the office of elder. In May 1861, he was called to be a full-time missionary of the church in London. In 1863, Reynolds was reassigned as a missionary to the Liverpool area to work as a clerk for church apostle and mission president George Q. Cannon. When Cannon returned to the United States later that year, Reynolds retained his position as a clerk under the new mission president, apostle and counselor in the First Presidency, Daniel H. Wells. As mission clerk, one of the primary responsibilities Reynolds had was organizing and coordinating the efforts to assist European church members in emigrating to Utah Territory, where the headquarters of the church were located. While acting as mission clerk, Reynolds was asked to serve as the branch president of the Liverpool Branch.

Life in America
In May 1865, Reynolds was released as a missionary and invited to emigrate to Utah Territory. He traveled to Salt Lake City with fellow elders of the church, William S. Godbe and William H. Sherman, arriving on July 5, 1865. On July 22, 1865, mere weeks after his arrival in Utah, Reynolds married his first wife, Mary Ann Tuddenham. Soon afterwards, LDS Church president Brigham Young hired Reynolds as secretary to the First Presidency. Reynolds was ordained to the priesthood office of seventy by Israel Barlow on March 18, 1866.

In February 1869, Reynolds was elected by the legislature of the Utah Territory to be a member of the board of regency of the University of Deseret, which was later renamed the University of Utah. Reynolds was re-elected to this position by the legislature a number of times.

In May 1871, Young asked Reynolds to return to England to assist apostle Albert Carrington in the publication of the Millennial Star, a church newspaper for British Latter-day Saints. Reynolds did so, and in September of that year Carrington was required to return to the United States, leaving Reynolds as the de facto president of the church's European Mission. However, Reynolds was suffering from ill health due to a severe case of smallpox, and when Carrington returned in May 1872, Reynolds was sent home to Utah to recover.

Like many early Latter-day Saints, Reynolds practiced the religious principle of plural marriage. On August 3, 1874, Reynolds married his second wife, Amelia Jane Schofield. At this time, Young continued to employ Reynolds as the secretary to the First Presidency and also appointed him to be the manager of the Salt Lake Theatre. In 1875, Reynolds was elected as a member of the Salt Lake City Council.

Party to polygamy test case
In 1874, strong efforts were being made to prosecute Latter-day Saints who practiced polygamy in violation an 1862 Morrill Anti-Bigamy Act. Confident that the law would be declared to be an unconstitutional violation of the Free Exercise Clause of the First Amendment to the United States Constitution, the leaders of the church agreed to furnish a defendant for a test case. Young asked Reynolds if he would be willing to serve as the test defendant. Reynolds agreed and was indicted for bigamy by a grand jury on June 23, 1874.

Because it was a test case the church wished to pursue before the United States Supreme Court, Reynolds cooperated with investigators and the trial court, supplying the witnesses and testimony that proved he was married to two women at the same time. Reynolds was found guilty by a jury on April 1, 1875, and was sentenced to one year's imprisonment and a fine of five hundred dollars. On appeal, the indictment was overturned by the Utah Territory's Supreme Court because the grand jury had not been empanelled in compliance with the Poland Act. Thus, for the test case to proceed, Reynolds had to be reindicted and retried.

On October 30, 1875, Reynolds was indicted a second time; he was found guilty of bigamy by a jury on December 9 and sentenced to two years imprisonment of hard labor and a fine of five hundred dollars. On June 13, 1876, the Utah Supreme Court upheld the conviction. The stage was set for the case to be appealed to the Supreme Court of the United States.

Reynolds v. United States

Arguments were heard in the Reynolds case before the United States Supreme Court on November 14, 1878. On January 6, 1879, the Court issued its unanimous decision for Reynolds v. United States. The court rejected his argument that the Latter-day Saint practice of plural marriage was protected by the Free Exercise Clause of the First Amendment to the Constitution. Thus, his conviction was upheld, as was the constitutionality of the Morrill Anti-Bigamy Act. (The court did rule that the hard labor clause of his sentence was not permitted by law; as a result, this clause of his sentence was lifted.)

Imprisonment
Reynolds had been imprisoned in Utah since his second conviction was confirmed by the Utah Supreme Court in June 1876. After his failed appeal to the Supreme Court, Reynolds was transferred from a jail in Utah to the Nebraska State Penitentiary in Lincoln, where he became U.S. Prisoner Number 14 and was appointed to be the bookkeeper in the knitting department. Reynolds only remained in the Nebraska penitentiary for 25 days, after which he was transferred to the Utah Territory Penitentiary, where regulations were more primitive and vermin more abundant. Reynolds reported that the prisoners were not permitted to have a fire for fear that the prison would burn down; as a result, on many winter mornings he would awake and his beard would be one solid mass of ice. Reynolds was released from prison on January 20, 1881, having served his full sentence, less five months for good behavior. He was pardoned in 1894 by U.S. President Grover Cleveland.

Life after release from prison
Upon his release from prison, Reynolds resumed his position as secretary to the First Presidency; he also became an active organizer within the Deseret Sunday School Union (DSSU), acting as the editor of and writing many articles for its publication, the Juvenile Instructor. From 1899 until his death in 1909, Reynolds was a first or second assistant to three general superintendents of the DSSU: From 1899 to 1901, he was the second assistant to George Q. Cannon; in 1901 he was first assistant to Lorenzo Snow; and from 1901 until 1909 he was first assistant to Joseph F. Smith.

On April 25, 1885, Reynolds married his third and final wife, Mary Goold. His first wife, Mary Ann, died on December 17, 1885, following the birth of a child.

In 1890, LDS Church president Wilford Woodruff asked Reynolds to become one of the seven members of the First Council of Seventy, a calling in the church hierarchy that ranked just below the Quorum of the Twelve Apostles. Reynolds agreed, and on April 10, Reynolds was set apart to this position by Lorenzo Snow, who was then president of the Quorum of the Twelve Apostles. Reynolds continued in this position and as the secretary to the First Presidency until his death in 1909.

Reynolds was a gifted writer and after his release from prison he became active in writing religious literature. His most famous works are his Story of the Book of Mormon (1888), which was intended for children; Complete Concordance to the Book of Mormon (1900); and Dictionary of the Book of Mormon (1910).

Reynolds suffered a nervous breakdown in 1907 as a result of stress incident from overwork. He died from meningitis at Salt Lake City on August 9, 1909, at the age of 67. Reynolds had three wives and 32 children. One of his daughters married Joseph Fielding Smith.

Published works

See also
1890 Manifesto
Alice Louise Reynolds
Edmunds Act
Edmunds–Tucker Act
Reed Smoot hearings
Ruth H. Funk
Second Manifesto
Phrenology and the Latter Day Saint Movement

References

Sources
Jensen, Andrew (1901), Latter-day Saint Biographical Encyclopedia, vol. 1, Andrew Jensen History Co., 206.
.
 Van Orden, Bruce A. (1992), Prisoner for Conscience' Sake: The Life of George Reynolds, Salt Lake City, Utah: Deseret Book.

External links

Grampa Bill's G.A. Pages: George Reynolds

George Reynolds papers, MSS 10 at L. Tom Perry Special Collections, Brigham Young University
Transcription of above papers

1842 births
1909 deaths
19th-century Mormon missionaries
American Latter Day Saints
American members of the clergy convicted of crimes
American people convicted of bigamy
American prisoners and detainees
British Latter Day Saints
Burials at Salt Lake City Cemetery
Converts to Mormonism
Counselors in the General Presidency of the Sunday School (LDS Church)
Neurological disease deaths in Utah
Infectious disease deaths in Utah
Deaths from meningitis
Editors of Latter Day Saint publications
English Latter Day Saint writers
English Mormon missionaries
English emigrants to the United States
English general authorities (LDS Church)
Mission presidents (LDS Church)
Mormon missionaries in England
People from Marylebone
Presidents of the Seventy (LDS Church)
Prisoners and detainees of the United States federal government
Recipients of American presidential pardons
Secretaries to the First Presidency (LDS Church)
University of Utah people
19th-century American clergy